Sir Henry Worsley, 2nd Baronet (1613 – 11 September 1666) was an English politician who sat in the House of Commons of England  in 1640 and from 1660 to 1666. He supported the Parliamentarian side in the English Civil War.

Worsley was the son of Sir Richard Worsley, 1st Baronet and his wife Frances Neville daughter of Sir Henry Neville of Billingbere, Berkshire. He inherited the baronetcy on the death of his father in 1621.

In April 1640, Worsley was elected Member of Parliament for Newport (Isle of Wight) for the Short Parliament. He was re-elected for Newport in November 1640 for the Long Parliament and held the seat until he was excluded under Pride's Purge in 1648. He was High Sheriff of Hampshire in 1658.
 
After the Restoration in 1660, Worsley was elected MP for Newtown and held the seat until his death in 1666.

Worsley died at Compton Hampshire at the age of 53.

Worsley married Bridget Wallop, daughter of Sir Henry Wallop in 1634. His son Robert succeeded to the baronetcy.

References

 

1613 births
1666 deaths
Baronets in the Baronetage of England
High Sheriffs of Hampshire
Roundheads
English MPs 1640 (April)
English MPs 1640–1648
English MPs 1660
English MPs 1661–1679
People from Newport, Isle of Wight
Henry Worsley, 2nd Baronet